Phoenix shooting may refer to:

Serial shootings committed by Dale Hausner and Samuel Dieteman, 2005–2006
Phoenix freeway shootings, 2015
Serial shootings committed by Aaron Saucedo, 2015–2016
Shooting of Ryan Whitaker, on May 21, 2020
Shooting of Dion Johnson, the fatal shooting of a black man